Reaching may refer to:

 Reaching (sailing), when a boat is traveling approximately perpendicular to the wind
 Reaching (album), a 2002 album by LaRue
 Reaching (sculpture), a 1987 public artwork by Zenos Frudakis

See also
 Reach (disambiguation)